Helleberg may refer to:

People
Bo Helleberg (born 1974), Danish lightweight rower
Jessica Helleberg (born 1986), Swedish handball player
Sven Helleberg (1929–1980), Norwegian politician

Places
 Helleberg (ridge), a hill ridge in the Leine Uplands, in the counties of Hildesheim and Northeim, Lower Saxony, Germany
 Helleberg (Elfas), the highest hill in the Elfas, in the county of Holzminden, Lower Saxony, Germany
 Helleberg (Ore Mountains), a summit in the Ore Mountains, in the county of Sächsische Schweiz-Osterzgebirge, Saxony, Germany 
 Helleberg (Westerwald), a hill in the Westerwald, in the county of Westerwaldkreis, Rhineland-Palatinate